The Ontario Rugby League (or the ORL) is a domestic rugby league football competition in Ontario, Canada operated by the Canada Rugby League. As of summer 2022, it has three clubs: Toronto Saints, Brantford Broncos, and a women's side.

Teams

Current clubs

Representative Squad

See also

Alberta Rugby League
British Columbia Rugby League
Rugby league in Canada
Toronto Wolfpack
Ottawa Aces

References

External links

Rugby league competitions in Canada
Sports leagues established in 2010
2010 establishments in Ontario
Sports leagues in Ontario